Rosemary Mosco is a cartoonist and writer working in science communication. She is best known for the science-and-nature comic Bird and Moon, and her graphic novels about nature. She also published a best-selling travel guide for children.

Personal life 
Mosco was raised in Ottawa, Ontario, where she would go hiking with her mom and then draw pictures of the wildlife they saw when they got back home. She holds a bachelor's degree in anthropology from McGill University and is a graduate of the Field Naturalist Program from the University of Vermont. She worked in communication and marketing positions at nonprofits such as Mass Audubon and the National Park Service. She has birds as pets.

Writing 
Mosco's work has been featured in The Guardian and the Huffington Post, on the radio program Science Friday, and by the Audubon Society. 

Her early webcomics include Wild Toronto and (with Maris Wicks) Wild City Comics. As of 2021, she writes the webcomic Bird and Moon. A collection of her comics titled Birding Is My Favorite Video Game was published in 2018 as a book, and included on the ALA's 2019 list of Great Graphic Novels for Teens. She published the graphic novel Solar Systems: Our Place In Space, aimed at middle school students.  

In 2018, she co-authored The Atlas Obscura Explorer’s Guide for the World’s Most Adventurous Kid, an illustrated guide to curious places cataloged in Atlas Obscura. This became a New York Times bestseller.

In 2021, she published the picture book Butterflies are Pretty…Gross!, and A Pocket Guide to Pigeon Watching. In 2022, she published Why City Pigeons Are Worth Watching in the New York Times.

Features 
In 2020, the PBS series NATURE featured Mosco in the video The Seriously Silly Science Cartoons Of Rosemary Mosco.

Awards 
In 2021, Mosco won a Reuben Award from the National Cartoonists Society for Bird and Moon.

References

External links 
 
 

Canadian female comics artists
Canadian webcomic creators
Canadian women children's writers
Living people
McGill University alumni
University of Vermont alumni
21st-century Canadian women writers
Year of birth missing (living people)